Songs and Music from the Motion Picture "She's the One" is the ninth studio album by American rock band Tom Petty and the Heartbreakers, first released in August 1996. The album served as the soundtrack for the 1996 film She's the One, written and directed by Edward Burns.

Songs and Music From the Motion Picture "She's the One" peaked at number 15 on the Billboard 200 albums chart and was certified gold by the RIAA in December 1996. The track "Walls (Circus)" peaked at number 69 on the Billboard Hot 100 and number 6 on the Mainstream Rock Tracks chart. "Climb That Hill" also peaked at number 6 on the Mainstream Rock Tracks chart, while "Change the Locks" peaked at number 20.

The album was not mentioned on the four-hour documentary Runnin' Down a Dream, though Petty could be seen doing a studio session of the song "Angel Dream (No. 4)".

Some songs were originally recorded for Wildflowers and were put on this album after it was decided to make Wildflowers a single album instead of a double album. She's the One is the only Tom Petty and the Heartbreakers album not to feature an official drummer, as they had not yet found a permanent drummer following the departure of Stan Lynch. Two of the tracks on this album feature Steve Ferrone on drums; Ferrone, who also played drums on nearly all tracks of the Wildflowers record, became the official Heartbreakers drummer shortly after this album was recorded. Curt Bisquera plays drums on most of the tracks on She's the One, while Ringo Starr was the drummer on "Hung Up and Overdue".

"Walls (No. 3)" was also featured in the Tom Hanks comedy, Larry Crowne.

Release history 
In April 2015, when Petty's back catalog was released in high-resolution audio, this was one of only two albums not included in the series (the other being Wildflowers).

Angel Dream
In early 2021 it was announced that a Record Store Day release of this album would completely rework it, resulting in it being renamed to Angel Dream. This version of the album takes off the tracks that were from the Wildflowers sessions (the ones added to the Wildflowers and All the Rest deluxe album) and replaces them with previously unreleased bonus tracks. These tracks include "105 Degrees" and "One of Life's Little Mysteries", both written by Petty, as well as a cover of J. J. Cale's "Thirteen Days" and the instrumental "French Disconnection".

Track listing

Angel Dream
Angel Dream was released in 2021 to mark the twenty-fifth anniversary of the original album and included the addition of four outtakes ("One of Life's Little Mysteries", J.J. Cale's "Thirteen Days", "105 Degrees", and the instrumental "French Disconnection"), while eliminating "Angel Dream (No.4)", "Hope On Board", "Airport", "Walls (Circus)" and a number of tracks that originated at the Wildflowers sessions.

Personnel
Tom Petty & the Heartbreakers
Tom Petty – vocals, guitars, harmonica, piano, harpsichord, tympani
Mike Campbell – guitars, piano, Marxophone
Benmont Tench – organ, piano
Howie Epstein – bass, background vocals

Additional musicians
Curt Bisquera – drums except on "Hung Up and Overdue", "Hope You Never", "California", "Angel Dream (No. 2)", "One of Life's Little Mysteries", "Thirteen Days", "105 Degrees", and "French Disconnection"
Lindsey Buckingham – background vocals on "Walls (Circus)", "Climb That Hill", and "Asshole"
Steve Ferrone – drums on "Hope You Never" and "California"
Lili Haydn – violin
Michael Severens – cello
Gerri Sutyak – cello
Chris Trujillo – percussion
Ringo Starr – drums on "Hung Up and Overdue"
Carl Wilson – harmony vocals on "Hung Up and Overdue"
Stan Lynch – drums on "One of Life's Little Mysteries", "Thirteen Days", and "105 Degrees"

Production
Mike Campbell – producer
George Drakoulias – A&R
Greg Fidelman – assistant engineer
Stephen Marcussen – mastering
Sylvia Massy – engineer
Tom Petty – producer
Rick Rubin – producer
Jim Scott – engineer, mixer
Rich Veltrop – assistant engineer
Tom Winslow – assistant engineer

Charts

Weekly charts

Year-end charts

Singles

Certifications

References

1996 albums
1996 soundtrack albums
Tom Petty soundtracks
Warner Records soundtracks
Albums produced by Rick Rubin
Albums produced by Tom Petty
Albums recorded at Sound City Studios
Romance film soundtracks
Comedy film soundtracks